Bay Qasoor is a Pakistani television serial premiered on 11 November 2015 on ARY Digital. It is produced by Fahad Mustafa and Ali Kazmi under Big Bang Entertainment.  The cast includes Samina Peerzada, Sajid Hassan, Saboor Ali, Waseem Abbas and Aiman Khan among others.

Cast 
 Samina Pirzada as Sadaf
 Sajid Hassan as Shehryar
 Saboor Aly as Hira (Daughter of Sadaf and Shehryar)
 Waseem Abbas as Waseem
 Aiman Khan as Seher (Spoiled Daughter of Waseem)
 Javeria Abbasi as Nuzhat
 Salahuddin Tunio as Amin 
 Muneeb Butt as Babar (Proposed to marry Hira)
 Raeed Muhammad Alam as Sunny 
 Fozia Mushtaq
 Najma Kawis

See also 
 List of programs broadcast by ARY Digital

References

External links 

2016 Pakistani television series debuts
2016 Pakistani television series endings
Pakistani drama television series
ARY Digital original programming
ARY Digital